The 2023 World Single Distances Speed Skating Championships were held from 2 to 5 March 2023, at Thialf in Heerenveen, Netherlands.

Schedule
All times are local (UTC+1).

Medal summary

Medal table

Men's events

Women's events

References

External links
Results

 
2023 Single Distances
2023 in speed skating
World Single Distances, 2023
2023 in Dutch sport
March 2023 sports events in Europe
Sports competitions in Heerenveen